Sarang is a small village near the town of Dapoli, in Maharashtra state in Western India. The 2011 Census of India recorded a total of 829 residents in the village.

References

Villages in Ratnagiri district